Jangpura is a Delhi Metro station in Delhi. It is located between JLN Stadium and Lajpat Nagar stations on the Violet Line in Jangpura locality. The station was opened with the first section of the Line on 3 October 2010, in time for the Commonwealth Games opening ceremony on the same day.

Station layout

Facilities
ATMs are available at Jangpura metro station.

Landmarks
Near AddtoGoogle Services (A Unit of SNZ Networks Pvt Ltd.)

See also
List of Delhi Metro stations
Transport in Delhi
Delhi Metro Rail Corporation
Delhi Suburban Railway

References

External links

 Delhi Metro Rail Corporation Ltd. (Official site) 
 Delhi Metro Annual Reports
 
 UrbanRail.Net – descriptions of all metro systems in the world, each with a schematic map showing all stations.

Delhi Metro stations
Railway stations opened in 2010
Railway stations in South Delhi district